Studleys Pond, known locally as Reed's Pond, is a  pond in Rockland, Massachusetts. The French Stream flows through the pond. Gideon's Island, named after Gideon Studley, lies in the southern portion of the pond. Thomas V. Mahon Park, a park which is owned by the Town of Rockland and is accessible from Route 123, lies along the southern shore of the pond.

External links
Environmental Protection Agency
South Shore Coastal Watersheds - Lake Assessments

Ponds of Plymouth County, Massachusetts
Rockland, Massachusetts
Ponds of Massachusetts